Messerschmidt or Messerschmitt is an occupational surname of German origin, which means cutler or knifemaker, from the Middle High German words mezzer "knife" + smit "smith". It may refer to:

Alfons Messerschmitt (born 1943), German sport shooter 
Daniel Gottlieb Messerschmidt (1685–1735), German physician
David Messerschmitt (born 1945), American electrical engineer
Erik Messerschmidt (born 1980), American cinematographer
Franz Xaver Messerschmidt (1736–1783), Austrian sculptor
Harold O. Messerschmidt (1923–1944), American soldier
Jana Messerschmidt (born 1990), German karateka
Manfred Messerschmidt (1926–2022), German historian
Morten Messerschmidt (born 1980), Danish politician
Nadine Messerschmidt (born 1993), German sport shooter
Pius Ferdinand Messerschmitt (1858–1915), German painter
Rasmus Messerschmidt (born 1992), Danish badminton player
Uwe Messerschmidt (born 1962), German cyclist
Willy Messerschmitt (1898–1978), German aircraft designer

See also
Messerschmitt, a German aircraft manufacturer

References

German-language surnames
Occupational surnames

de:Messerschmidt